Lavara is a town located in the eastern part of Evros regional unit. In 1821, Lavara participated in the Greek War of Independence and rose up against the Ottoman Empire. It was the seat of the municipality of Orfeas. It is located 2 km from Turkey and the western bank of the river Evros.

Historical population

References

Orfeas
Populated places in Evros (regional unit)